Oswald Ludwig Pohl (30 June 1892 – 7 June 1951) was a German SS functionary during the Nazi era. As the head of the SS Main Economic and Administrative Office and the head administrator of the Nazi concentration camps, he was a key figure in the Final Solution, the genocide of the European Jews.

After the war, Pohl went into hiding; he was apprehended in 1946. Pohl stood trial in 1947, was convicted of crimes against humanity, and sentenced to death. After repeatedly appealing his case, he was executed by hanging in 1951.

Early life and career
Oswald Pohl was born in Duisburg-Ruhrort on 30 June 1892 to blacksmith, Hermann Otto Emil Pohl, and his wife Auguste Pohl (née Seifert); he was the fifth of eight children. His parents were financially secure, and he attended a Realgymnasium where he studied classical Greek and Latin texts. From what Pohl claimed, he always wanted to study science but his father did not have the means to send him straight to university. In 1912, he became a sailor in the Imperial Navy.  During World War I, he served in the Baltic Sea region and the coast of Flanders. Pohl attended a navy school, and became paymaster on 1 April 1918. On 30 October of the same year, he married.

After the end of the war, Pohl attended courses at a trade school, and began studying law and state theory at the Christian-Albrechts-Universität in Kiel; he dropped out of university soon again though, and became paymaster for the Freikorps "Brigade Löwenfeld", working in Berlin, Upper Silesia and the Ruhr basin. In 1920, like many others involved in the Lüttwitz-Kapp Putsch, he was accepted into the Weimar Republic's new navy, the Reichsmarine. Pohl was transferred to Swinemünde in 1924.

SS career
One year later, in 1925, Pohl became a member of the SA, then finally joined the re-founded Nazi Party on 22 February 1926 as member #30842. Sometime during 1929, Pohl became a member of the SS. Pohl proclaimed in 1932, "I was a National Socialist before National Socialism came into being." He met Heinrich Himmler in 1933, coming to his attention at the behest of Admiral Wilhelm Canaris who described Pohl as an "energetic" officer and a "dedicated Nazi". Pohl quickly made himself available to the younger Himmler after their first meeting at a Kiel Biergarten. While he already presided over as many as 500 men in his role in the German Navy, as a dedicated Nazi, he jumped at the chance to be a commissioned officer in Himmler's SS. Pohl promised Himmler that he would serve him until he dropped and rose quickly due to his "ruthlessness" and his unwavering "loyalty".

Once an officer in the SS, Pohl furiously set to work, putting his 20-plus years of administrative experience into action; he managed to successfully standardize and professionalize the SS accounting operations, so much so that it was able to withstand a public audit, which garnered more respect from national agencies for Himmler's SS. Pohl was quickly promoted as a result. Capable administrative officers were recruited and assigned to the concentration camps due to Pohl's efforts. Eventually Pohl was appointed chief of the administration department in the staff of the Reichsführer-SS. His career continued to thrive when Himmler made him administrative chief over the SD Main Office and the Race and Settlement Office on 1 June 1935. Two of Pohl's predecessors, Paul Weickert and Gerhard Schneider, were dismissed from the SS for embezzlement. Pohl founded the "Gesellschaft zur Förderung und Pflege deutscher Kulturdenkmäler" ("Society for the preservation and fostering of German cultural monuments"), which was primarily dedicated to restoring Wewelsburg, an old castle that was supposed to be turned into a cultural and scientific headquarters of the SS at Himmler's request. The "society" soon became a part of Pohl's SS administration office. Pohl left the Roman Catholic Church in 1935.

Concentration camp administrator and WVHA chief 

Over time, Pohl's orbit of responsibility began to include the concentration camp system since he lived near the camp at Dachau and inspected them from time to time. During the early establishment of the concentration camps in the mid-1930s, Pohl already recognized the economic potential of forced labor. Shortly after the Austrian Anschluss in March 1938, Pohl, who at this time was already administrative chief of the SS-Hauptamt, accompanied Himmler to the small town of Mauthausen where it was decided that the SS-operated German Earth and Stoneworks Corporation (DEST) would begin excavating granite, using concentration camp prisoners as slave laborers. Administrative and financial authority for the camps and the SS Death's Head troops were conveyed to Pohl by 1938, which pitted him against his contemporary and peer, Theodor Eicke, particularly on matters of administration, budget, and building projects.

In June 1939 Pohl became chief of both the Verwaltung und Wirtschaft Hauptamt (VuWHA) and the Hauptamt Haushalt und Bauten ("main bureau [for] budget and construction", part of the Reich's Ministry of the Interior). Himmler stated that: "The supervision of the economic matters of these institutions (concentration camps) and their application to work is the responsibility of SS Gruppenfuehrer Pohl". The day before the Wannsee Conference, 19 January 1942, Himmler consolidated all of the offices for which Pohl was responsible into one, creating the SS Main Economic and Administrative Office (Wirtschafts- und Verwaltungshauptamt; WVHA). While already a significant figure in the regime, Pohl's appointment as chief of the WVHA strengthened his position greatly. Behind Heinrich Himmler and Reinhard Heydrich, he eventually became the third most powerful figure in the SS. Placing Pohl's position into perspective, historian Heinz Höhne wrote, "Four potent departments placed Pohl's hand firmly on the levers of power in the SS empire: he was in charge of the entire administration and supply of the Waffen-SS; he controlled the 20 concentration camps and 165 labor camps; he directed all SS and Police building projects; he was in charge of all SS economic enterprises."

As the head of the economics division of the SS, Pohl was appointed to run the Deutscher Wirtschaftsbetrieb (German Industrial Concern; GmbH), an organization he helped establish. It was designed to unify the massive business interests of Himmler's SS, taking in profits from the slave labour of concentration camp prisoners. Under Pohl's leadership, the WVHA turned its attention—once focused primarily on security and re-education—towards economic matters. To merge operations, Pohl announced the incorporation of the inspectorate of concentration camps into the WVHA on 13 March 1942. Expressing his sentiments regarding the use of prisoners for labor in a memo, Pohl wrote, "SS industries [Unternehmen] have the task ... to organize a more businesslike (more productive) execution of punishment and adjust it to the overall development of the Reich." Agreeing in general terms that many of the prisoners should be worked to death, Pohl paradoxically complained about the death of some 70,610 out of 136,870 new concentration camp inmates between June and November 1942, insisting that these deaths were impeding productive output at the camp's armament factories.

Expanding his power ever further over the economic realm, Pohl was named chairman of the board of directors for the Eastern Territories Industries Inc. (Ostindustrie GmbH) on 12 March 1943. Despite the seeming intention to use concentration camp prisoners for production in the expanding SS economics industry, Pohl's role was also framed by the ideological mandates of exploitation and racial extermination. For example, evidence indicates that Pohl refused to allow any increases in rations for starving prisoners toiling in the Granite Works of Gross-Rosen concentration camp, when there were administrative complaints in favor of providing more food to the inmates. According to historian Michael Thad Allen, "Pohl's men prided themselves as modern administrators" and often clashed with prison guards who "undermined productivity" by beating or killing prisoners. An irreconcilable duplicity emerged over the conflicting goals between the pragmatic economic interests of the SS under Pohl's purview and their fanatical racialist ideological imperatives. Fulfilling a call beyond mere economic interests but one based on communal concerns prompted Pohl's thinking when he informed the Reich's Interior Ministry in a letter that, "It is the will of the Reichsführer-SS that profits from lucrative corporations be diverted to cover the losses of others that must labor under the constraints of their non-capitalistic [nicht privatwirtschaftliche] end goals. At times these goals damn our corporations to years of future losses." In this manner, Pohl helped provide SS companies with their "ideological raison d’être." Along with other SS ideologues, Pohl wanted the SS to lead the Nazi revolution through the creation of an economic base that focused on communal industrial interests versus the despised principles of western style capitalism that served individuals; in the process he intended on employing concentration camp prisoners to serve the greater interests of the Reich. For Pohl, that also meant completely "exhausting forced labor."

Pohl oversaw the organization of the concentration camps, deciding on the distribution of detainees to the various camps and the "rental" of detainees for slave labour until 1944. The exploitation of the captives rested on the Nazi principle of "extermination through labor". Human material was to be efficiently and fully exploited in the process and as former Buchenwald political prisoner and historian Eugen Kogon points out, Pohl insisted on extracting the maximum financial worth from each and every camp laborer. Kogon asserts that Pohl even created evaluative tables that calculated their value as farmed-out wage earners (minus the depreciation of food and clothing), their profit intake from valuables (watches, clothing, money) remaining after their deaths (minus crematoria expenses), and any costs recovered from selling their bones and ashes; in total, the average concentration camp inmate had a life expectancy of nine months or less and was valued at 1,630 marks. Along these lines, Pohl supervised the macabre task of collecting Jewish people's gold fillings, hair, clothing, jewelry and other possessions. These "spoils", taken from the concentration camp inmates (mostly Jews) were carefully itemized and sold at prices set by the WVHA.

In keeping with Pohl's plan, concentration camps were to be constructed at Auschwitz, Lublin (Majdanek), and Stutthof to facilitate a "vertically integrated construction and building supply enterprise." The catalyst for the expansion of SS construction initiatives stemmed from Hitler's megalomania, namely, his plans to erect massive German cities and monuments (masterminded by the young architect Albert Speer) as the Reich expanded. Himmler was likewise inspired by these plans which would expand SS production and "boost the status of the SS". To accomplish the job of carrying out the Führer's vision, Pohl created the East German Building Supply Works (Ost-Deutsche Baustoffwerke GmbH; ODBS) along with the German Noble Furniture Corporation (Deutsche Edelmöbel GmbH) with the aid of Dr. Emil Meyer, an officer in the Allgemeine-SS and prominent figure within the Dresdner Bank.

Despite holding a "nominal" rank in the Waffen-SS, Pohl and the WVHA had "no direct connection" to the combat formations of the SS. Pohl nonetheless showed unwavering commitment to the cause and tenets of Nazism when performing his duties and stressed the importance in fulfilling the tasks outlined by the Reichsführer-SS. By those tasks he meant the policing duties related to the Reich's security, those concerning the concentration camp system and industry, those duties which promoted the Nazi world-view, and any undertaking related to the "Reinforcement of Germandom." Shortly before the invasion of the Soviet Union, Himmler wrote to Pohl about not needing to conceal any "hidden agendas" from him and emphasized the "essential" task of increasing "good and worthy" blood (Germans) through nutrition and SS settlements.

During the spring of 1942, Hitler and other Nazi elites looked to increase armaments production through the use of concentration camp inmates. This coincided with Pohl's control over the concentration camp system. Grandiose building plans for new SS facilities in the East were laid aside in favor of arms production, which Pohl thought prudent and necessary. While Himmler and Pohl foresaw an enormous SS-operated armaments industry, they encountered opposition from the newly appointed armaments minister, Albert Speer, who undermined their initial projects. Aside from the moderately successful aircraft parts manufacturing operation at Flossenbürg concentration camp and Himmler's boasting in October 1943 of a "giant" SS-run system of armament works, "the SS had failed to become a serious arms manufacturer". Pohl worked in tandem with Speer for arms production, despite the latter's lack of faith in the SS industrial complex. Satellite camps which leased out concentration camp labor spread as a result of the collaboration between the industrialists and the SS, due in part to both Pohl and Speer's arrangements. Concentration camp inmates were not supposed to be leased-out on orders from Himmler, a directive Pohl ignored for he considered it impractical given the inability of the SS to establish production processes in short order. An enterprise overseen by Pohl and one Speer was keen on as well, was the construction works at Dora-Mittelbau, the underground complex where the V2 rockets were assembled. This enormous subterranean facility near Nordhausen in the Harz Mountains was completed in a mere two months using camp labor supplied by Pohl. Work on the prestigious wonder-weapon V1 and V2 projects remained bitterly contested between the SS and Speer's ministry.

By the summer of 1944, control of the concentration camps was removed from Pohl's WVHA and executive power was instead given over to local HSSPF offices, which, according to Pohl, occurred for operational reasons. Speer's armaments ministry took over arms production without the intermediation of the WVHA in the application process for industrial firms seeking business with the Reich. Estimates provided by Pohl indicate that during the second half of 1944, there were upwards of 250,000 slaves working for private firms, another 170,000 working in underground factories and an additional 15,000 clearing rubble from the Allied bombing raids.

Trial, conviction and execution

After the end of World War II in 1945, Pohl first hid in Upper Bavaria, then near Bremen. Disguised as a farmhand, he was arrested by British troops in May 1946 and sentenced to death on 3 November 1947 by an American military tribunal in the eponymous Pohl Trial. Pohl was the chief defendant for the proceedings at the fourth Nuremberg trial; he and his co-conspirators were on trial for crimes committed in the concentration camps administered by the SS-WVHA while he was in charge. Without denying his knowledge of the mass killings of Jews, Pohl presented himself as a mere executive, accusing the prosecution of being guided by feelings of hatred and revenge. Pohl appealed his death sentence several times. During the Nuremberg trials, he started to see a Roman Catholic priest and recommitted himself to the Catholic faith. Officially, Pohl had never left the Catholic Church, although he stopped attending Mass in 1935. In 1950, his re-conversion resulted in the appearance of his book Credo. Mein Weg zu Gott ("Credo. My way to God"), which was published with permission of the Catholic Church. Pohl was hanged shortly after midnight on 7 June 1951 at Landsberg Prison in Landsberg am Lech. Pohl's last words were "I have spent more than 30 years as a military man. I have always carried out orders and remained true to my oath of allegiance. I am ready."

See also
Deutsche Wirtschaftsbetriebe
Ernst Lerch
Forced labor in Nazi concentration camps

References

Citations

Bibliography

 
 

 
 
 
 
 
 
 
 
 
 
 
     
 
 
   
 
 
 
 
 
 
 
 
 
 
 
 

1892 births
1951 deaths
Military personnel from Duisburg
People from the Rhine Province
German Roman Catholics
Holocaust perpetrators
Members of the Reichstag of Nazi Germany
Recipients of the Knights Cross of the War Merit Cross
Nazi concentration camps
Recipients of the Iron Cross (1914), 2nd class
Sturmabteilung officers
SS-Obergruppenführer
German people convicted of crimes against humanity
Executed people from North Rhine-Westphalia
Executions by the United States Nuremberg Military Tribunals
Prisoners and detainees of the British military
Imperial German Navy personnel of World War I
20th-century Freikorps personnel
Reichsmarine personnel
Romani genocide perpetrators
Waffen-SS personnel
Executed mass murderers